David Zvi Hoffmann (November 24, 1843, Verbó, Austrian Empire – November 20, 1921, Berlin) (Hebrew: דוד צבי הופמן), was an Orthodox Rabbi and Torah Scholar. He headed the Yeshiva in Berlin, and published research on the Pentateuch and Mishna, both in reaction to erstwhile  Biblical criticism.
He is referred to as רד"צ הופמן - Radatz Hoffmann - in later Rabbinic writing.

He was an expert in Midrash halakha and the foremost halakhic authority in Germany in his generation.
He is well known for his strident literary opposition to the Graf-Wellhausen theories of Biblical origin, while on the other hand, he quotes prominent Wissenschaft figures in his researches on Mishnah and Talmud.
His commentary on the Pentateuch is still often referred to.

Education and career
Born in Verbó in 1843, he attended various Yeshivas in his native town before he entered the college at Pressburg, from which he graduated in 1865. He then studied philosophy, history, and Oriental languages at Vienna and Berlin, taking his doctor's degree in 1871 from the University of Tübingen. His rabbinical training was under Moshe Schick and Azriel Hildesheimer.

Shortly after obtaining his degree, he became employed as a teacher in Samson Raphael Hirsch's Realschule school in Frankfurt am Main, and in 1873 moved to Berlin to join the faculty of the Rabbinical Seminary of Berlin where he eventually became rector (Rosh Yeshiva) in 1899 after the death of Azriel Hildesheimer.

A selective Wissenschaft practitioner
David Hoffmann is in some ways the prototype of the contemporary Orthodox Jewish scholar, facing the ubiquitous tension between faithfulness to tradition and the demands of critical inquiry. Though born in Hungary, he adapted the German-Jewish approach of openness towards general culture, world and society. 

He employed the critical scientific method to the Talmud and wrote about the history of the development of the form of the Oral law (as opposed to the development of the Law itself, the latter being an enterprise antithetical to traditional Jewish beliefs; see below). Despite this, he was an original member of the more traditionally oriented Moetzes Gedolei HaTorah (council of great Torah sages), and was also known to be "of great moral conduct and piety".

Hoffman was the leading authority on traditional halakha (Jewish law) in Germany in his lifetime, as well as an expert in the area of midrash halakha (legalistic Biblical exegesis). 
He was also known for his efforts to disprove the Documentary Hypothesis, as expressed by the Graf-Wellhausen theory, with his arguments presented in the work Die wichtigsten Instanzen gegen die Graf-Wellhausensche Hypothese (1903/1916).  

A. Altmann, however, sees Hoffmann's writings on these matters (though evidencing great expertise) as pure apologetics, the cause of which may be seen as laid out in his introduction to Leviticus , where Hoffmann makes the following remarks:

  
Yet, despite the piety of the above sentiments, and his repeated proclamations regarding the divinity of the Oral Law, Hoffmann was still very much the Wissenschaft scholar. He cites in his work scholars such as Z. Frankel, A. Geiger, S.J. Rapoport, and H. Graetz, he studies the influences of Ancient Near Eastern culture on the evolution of the Talmud, and he identifies problems in the transmitted text. For example, Hoffmann in The First Mishna (discussed below) sees the present Mishna Avot as having been redacted from three different sources, a Mishna of Rabbi Akiva, a Mishna of Rabbi Meir, and a Mishna of Rabbi Judah Ha-Nasi, the originals of which cannot be completely reconstructed due to their thoroughgoing fusion and subsequent manipulation.

The extent to which Hoffmann resided in the Wissenschaft movement can also be seen from the criticism he received from such opponents of the movement as Samson Raphael Hirsch. Hildesheimer notes regarding Hirsch's opinion of his Rabbinical Seminary (where Hoffmann worked after leaving Hirsch's institution) that "a question certainly exists as to whether Rabbi Hirsch considers the seminary to be an Orthodox institution." Hirsch's opposition extended to Hoffmann's own work, judging Hoffmann's book Mar Samuel to contain heresies .

Writings
Hoffman produced the Die Erste Mishna (The First Mishna), mentioned above, a historical and linguistic analysis of the Mishnah.
Die Erste Mishna posits an early, uniform, undisputed, and therefore authoritative collection of the Oral Law, attempting to understand the historical development of the Mishnah from within itself and from rabbinic and non-rabbinic sources related to it.
In this and the below work, Hoffmann draws on his expertise in midrash halakha and Semitic languages.
For further context, see Oral Torah #In rabbinic literature and commentary.

His commentary on the Pentateuch that included a translation of the text into German, is still widely cited. In it, he addresses erstwhile biblical criticism, particularly questions of God’s names and of the Torah’s antiquity. 
The work began as a series of lectures which he gave in the Rabbinical Seminary.
Originally, commentaries on Bereishit, Vayikra, and Devarim were published, starting in 1904; his commentary on Shemot was published by Mossad Harav Kook only in 2010. 
The commentaries on Vayikra and Devarim were written by Radatz himself, 
while the commentaries on Bereishit and Shemot were written by his students, based on manuscripts of his lectures.

Hoffmann's Melamed Le-ho'il, are responsa on then contemporary issues, as based on historical evidence of tradition. He also published a translation of two of the orders of the Mishna into German.

Most of his writings were in German and remain so to this day. The First Mishna was translated into English, and a selection of his comments on the Passover Haggada have been published in Hebrew as well. His Pentateuch commentary was later translated into Hebrew; though today out of print, it is available online.

References
General
.
Cited

External links
 His Pentateuch commentary translated into Hebrew: Genesis, Deuteronomy
 Zur Einleitung in die halachischen Midraschim
 The first Mishna / The highest court by Rabbi Dr David Hoffmann, translated by Paul Forchheimer
 Digitized works by David Zvi Hoffmann at the Leo Baeck Institute, New York

1843 births
1921 deaths
People from Vrbové
Slovak rabbis

19th-century German rabbis
Hungarian Orthodox rabbis
Hildesheimer Rabbinical Seminary alumni
20th-century German rabbis